Gibson is a city in Glascock County, Georgia, United States. The population was 663 at the 2010 census. The city is the county seat of Glascock County and home to the Glascock County Courthouse, a National Register of Historic Places listed site.

Gibson's name was derived from Judge William Gibson, a former Confederate colonel and commanding officer of the 48th Georgia, who donated $500 for Glascock County's first public building, the courthouse.

History
Gibson was founded in 1865

 as seat of the newly formed Glascock County. It was incorporated as a town in 1913 and as a city in 1943.

Geography
Gibson is located slightly northeast of the center of Glascock County at  (33.232737, -82.595301). Georgia State Routes 102 and 171 cross in the center of town. GA 102 leads west  to Mitchell and east  to Stapleton, while GA 171 leads north  to Warrenton and south  to Louisville. Augusta,  to the northeast, is the closest large city.

Rocky Comfort Creek, a southeast-flowing tributary of the Ogeechee River, passes through the northern part of Gibson.

Demographics

As of the 2010 United States Census, there were 663 people living in the city. The racial makeup of the city was 86.6% White, 11.5% Black, 0.2% Native American, 0.3% from some other race and 1.2% from two or more races. 0.3% were Hispanic or Latino of any race.

As of the census of 2000, there were 694 people, 267 households, and 166 families living in the city. The racial makeup of the city was 87.90% White, 11.67% African American, 0.29% Native American, and 0.14% from two or more races. Hispanic or Latino of any race were 0.29% of the population.

There were 267 households, out of which 25.5% had children under the age of 18 living with them, 46.1% were married couples living together, 14.2% had a female householder with no husband present, and 37.5% were non-families. 34.5% of all households were made up of individuals, and 17.6% had someone living alone who was 65 years of age or older.  The average household size was 2.21 and the average family size was 2.80.

In the city, the population was spread out, with 18.6% under the age of 18, 6.5% from 18 to 24, 22.3% from 25 to 44, 21.6% from 45 to 64, and 31.0% who were 65 years of age or older.  The median age was 48 years. For every 100 females, there were 69.7 males.  For every 100 females age 18 and over, there were 66.2 males.

The median income for a household in the city was $18,667, and the median income for a family was $31,364. Males had a median income of $30,729 versus $18,500 for females. The per capita income for the city was $12,058.  About 15.3% of families and 32.1% of the population were below the poverty line, including 18.4% of those under age 18 and 53.1% of those age 65 or over.

Education

Glascock County School District 
The Glascock County School District holds pre-school to grade twelve, in a consolidated school under one roof. The district has 42 full-time teachers and over 568 students.

See also

Central Savannah River Area

References

External links
 The News and Farmer and Wadley Herald / Jefferson Reporter, the county's weekly newspaper and the oldest weekly newspaper in Georgia

Cities in Georgia (U.S. state)
Cities in Glascock County, Georgia
County seats in Georgia (U.S. state)